This is an alphabetical list of notable baseball players born in California who have played in Major League Baseball.



A

 Don Aase
 Paul Abbott
 Bill Abernathie
 Joe Abreu
 Mark Acre
 Ace Adams
 Bobby Adams
 Dick Adams
 Herb Adams
 Red Adams
 Ricky Adams
 Joel Adamson
 Mike Adamson
 Dave Adlesh
 Troy Afenir
 Chris Aguila
 Rick Aguilera
 Hank Aguirre
 Pat Ahearne
 Jack Aker
 Mike Aldrete
 Gary Alexander
 Scott Alexander
 Kim Allen
 Lloyd Allen
 Rod Allen
 Gary Allenson
 Abe Alvarez
 Joey Amalfitano
 Rich Amaral
 Hector Ambriz
 Ed Amelung
 Bryan Anderson
 Cody Anderson

B

 Jake Barrett
 Joe Biagini
 Matt Bush

D

 Chris Devenski

G

 Tyler Goeddel

M

 Greg Mahle

O

 Steven Okert

S

 Steve Selsky
 Robert Stephenson

W

 Colin Walsh
 Nick Wittgren
 Tony Wolters

References

Players Born in California - Baseball-Reference.com

Baseball players from California